is a feminine Japanese given name.

Possible writings
Natsuko can be written using different kanji characters and can mean:
夏子, "summer, child"
懐子, "reminiscence, yearn, child"
捺子, "press, print, affix a seal, stamp, child"
奈津子 "Nara, harbor, child"
菜津子 "vegetables, harbor, child"
那津子 "what, harbor, child"
The name can also be written in hiragana なつこ, or katakana ナツコ.

People
with the given name Natsuko
 Natsuko Aso (麻生 夏子), Japanese actress and J-pop actress
 Natsuko Fujimori (藤森 奈津子), women's professional shogi player
 Natsuko Hara (原 菜摘子), Japanese football midfielder who plays for NTV Beleza in the L. League
, Japanese concubine
 Natsuko Higuchi (樋口 夏子), a Japanese author during the Meiji period and Japan´s first prominent woman writer of modern times
 Natsuko Kuwatani (桑谷 夏子, born 1978), a Japanese voice actress
, Japanese swimmer
 Natsuko Sone (曽根 菜津子), a Japanese competitive eater
 Natsuko Takahashi, a Japanese anime screenwriter
 Natsuko Toda (戸田 奈津子), a Japanese subtitles translator
 Natsuko Yamamoto (山本 奈津子), a Japanese actress
, Japanese comedian

Fictional characters
with the given name Natsuko
 Natsuko Aki (夏子), a character in the Japanese live action drama series Cutie Honey The Live
 Natsuko Shōno (ナツ子), a character from the manga and anime series Kinnikuman and its sequel Kinnikuman Nisei

Japanese feminine given names